Acanthophila bimaculata is a moth in the family Gelechiidae. It is found in China (Shaanxi, Henan, Sichuan, Hubei, Anhui, Guizhou, Hunan, Jiangxi, Zhejiang, Fujian, Guangxi, Guangdong).

The larvae feed on Cunninghamia lanceolata.

References

bimaculata
Moths described in 1994
Moths of Asia